New York population may refer to:

New York state demographics
Demographics of New York City

Disambiguation pages